The Bobo language is a Mande language of Burkina Faso and Mali; the western city of Bobo Dioulasso is named partly for the Bobo people. It consists of Southern and Northern dialect. The Northern dialect is also known as Konabéré. Northern and Southern Bobo share only 20%–30% intelligibility according to Ethnologue, and by that standard are considered separate languages.

The terms Bobo Fing 'Black Bobo' and Bobo Madaré are used to distinguish them from Bobo Gbe 'White Bobo' and the Bobo Oule 'Red Bobo' of Burkina.

References

External links
 Bobo basic lexicon at the Global Lexicostatistical Database

Mande languages
Languages of Burkina Faso